Alucita seychellensis is a species of moth of the family Alucitidae described by Thomas Bainbrigge Fletcher in 1910. It is known from the Seychelles in the Indian Ocean.

References

Alucitidae
Moths of Seychelles
Moths described in 1910